The Interim Control Module (ICM) is a NASA-constructed module designed to serve as a temporary "tug" for the International Space Station in case the Zvezda service module was destroyed or not launched for an extended period of time.  It was derived from a formerly-classified Titan Launch Dispenser used to distribute reconnaissance satellites to different orbits.  It would have been able to prolong the lifespan of the Zarya module by providing equivalent propulsion capabilities to the Service Module, although not any of the other life support capabilities.

After the successful launch of Zvezda, ICM was placed in a caretaker status at NRL's Payload Processing Facility in Washington, D.C. Should it become necessary to complete and launch ICM, it was estimated that it would take between two and two-and-a-half years to do so.

Since the ICM was mothballed, a variety of new uses for it have been proposed. Most seriously, it was proposed for use as part of a robotic servicing mission for the Hubble Space Telescope, before the final Shuttle servicing mission was approved. The ICM has also been suggested as an integral part of a new telescope based on unused spy satellite hardware, and even for use in its original role in the event of removal of the Russian Orbital Segment of the ISS.

References 

Components of the International Space Station